Saad Al Faraj (Arabic: سعد الفرج; born January 11, 1938) is a Kuwaiti actor.

Works

Plays 
24-hour (1967)
bny samit (1975)
ala al makshof (1996)

Series TV 
darb al zaliq (1977)
soq al miqaqis (2000)
eial al faqar (2007)

Movies 
bas ya bahar (1971)
al sidra (2001)
Tora Bora (2011)
Hami Aldiyar-The Documentary (2017)
Shabab Sheyab (2018)

References

External links 
 

1938 births
Living people
Kuwaiti male actors
Kuwaiti male stage actors
Kuwaiti male film actors
20th-century Kuwaiti male actors
21st-century Kuwaiti male actors